Following are the historical territorial acquisitions of the United States:

For information on internal territorial acquisitions, see List of U.S.–Native American treaties.

References

History of United States expansionism
Territorial evolution of the United States